KGOD-LP (94.1 FM) is a radio station licensed to Tenaha, Texas.  The station is currently owned by International Missionary Fellowship Inc. (IMF).

References

External links
 

GOD-LP
GOD-LP